Más Turbada Que Nunca (the literal translation is More Disturbed Than Ever, but it's actually a humorous pun on Masturbated than Ever) is the fourth studio album released by pop/rock singer Gloria Trevi in 1994.

The album featured 12 tracks with beats ranging from rock such as A Gatas (on all fours), El Juicio (The trial), La Renta (The rent), and rock ballads such as Chica Embarazada (pregnant girl), Por Ti (For you), Siempre A Mi (always to me), funk songs and ballads of love such as El Recuentro De Los Daños (The count of the damage) and Un Dia Mas De Vida (another day of life). The theme of the album reflects the daily experiences with Mexican slang, while exploring different rock-oriented sounds. Besides being a successful album in Mexico, it was also very popular in countries such as Peru, Guatemala and Ecuador while experimenting moderate success in the USA's latin music market. Similar to her two previous albums, Más Turbada Que Nunca experimented an instant success in sales, radio, and television after its release.

Track listing

Singles
Papa sin Catsup
El Recuento de los Daños
Qué Bueno Que no Fui Lady Di
Siempre a Mí

 1994 albums
 Gloria Trevi albums